This is a list of documentary films produced in Albania during the 1940s.

Documentary films
 Shqipëria (1945)
 Kongresi i dytë i Bashkimit të Rinisë Antifashiste Shqiptare (1946)
 1 Maj 1947 (1947)
 Komandanti viziton Shqipërinë e Mesme dhe të Jugut (1947)
 Qëndrimi i delegacionit shqiptar në Moskë (1947)
 Kongresi i parë i PKSH (1948)
 Në mbrojtje të paqes dhe lumturisë së popujve. Parada e 10 korrikut. (1948)
 Për mirëqënien e jetës së popullit tonë (1948)
 Shqipëria e re (1948)
 Vizita e delegacionit qeveritar shqiptar në Bullgari (1948)
 Festivali Folkloristik 1949 (1949)
 Hekurudha Durrës-Tiranë (1949)
 Kongresi i Unifikimit të Rinisë (1949)
 Qëndrimi i delegacionit qeveritar shqiptar në Moskë (1949)

References

Lists of Albanian films
Lists of documentary films